Gerald Abramovitz (5 November 1928 – 16 June 2011) was an architect and furniture designer. Born in South Africa, he studied architecture at the University of Pretoria and design at the Royal College of Art in London.

His work is part of the permanent collections of several museums, including the Museum of Modern Art in New York City. There his signature piece, a cantilevered desk lamp, is featured. He designed an award-winning chair for Knoll, the international furniture company, and the cantilever desk lamp of aluminum and steel for Best and Lloyd, the British design firm.

He died at the age of 82 on 16 June 2011 from injuries sustained in a violent mugging a month earlier.

References

External links
Notice of death of Gerald Abramovitz
Obituary in The Gothamist online

1928 births
2011 deaths
South African designers
University of Pretoria alumni
Alumni of the Royal College of Art
Deaths by beating in the United States
People murdered in New York City
Male murder victims
Place of birth missing
South African murder victims
South African people murdered abroad
20th-century South African architects